"All Day and Night" is a song by English DJ Jax Jones and French DJ Martin Solveig under their alias Europa, with vocals from American singer Madison Beer. It was released on 28 March 2019 as their first single through Polydor Records and appears on Jones' debut EP Snacks. The song was written by Jones, Solveig, Becky Hill, Hailee Steinfeld, Kamille, Jin Jin, and Mark Ralph. The single became Jones' and Beer's first and Solveig's second number-one on Billboard's Dance/Mix Show Airplay chart in its 6 July 2019 issue.

Background 
Europa reached out to Beer to record her vocals, which she accepted after she "loved" the song. Solveig said of the collaboration, "To have Madison on our first track is great. She has an undeniable truth in her vocal that we both really like and since launching her career she’s become an influential voice of her generation."

Music video
The music video for the song was released on April 11, 2019. It features heavily animated scenes intertwined with Madison Beer singing at various locations around a city. A secondary music video, referenced as a "Late Night Session," was released on May 7.

Promotion
Jones began teasing the track through social media in late March, announcing that his "first track" with Solveig would be out that Thursday. Beer performed the song solo in May 2019 during the Beale Street Music Festival.

Charts

Weekly charts

Year-end charts

Certifications

References

2019 songs
2019 debut singles
Europa (musical duo) songs
Madison Beer songs
Songs written by Jax Jones
Songs written by Martin Solveig
Songs written by Hailee Steinfeld
Songs written by Becky Hill
Songs written by Kamille (musician)
Songs written by Jin Jin (musician)
Songs written by Mark Ralph (record producer)
Song recordings produced by Mark Ralph (record producer)
Song recordings produced by Jax Jones